Park Heong-joon (born 19 January 1960) is a South Korean journalist, educator and politician. He was a former professor of the Sociology Department and Graduate School of International Studies at Dong-a University from 1 September 1991 to 12 March 2021.

He has been the Mayor of Busan since 8 April 2021. He was elected to the position in the by-election a day before that was provoked following the resignation of Oh Keo-don due to the allegations of sexual harassment. He successfully defeated the Democratic candidate Kim Young-choon with a large margin.

Park represented the Grand National Party (GNP) in the National Assembly as the Member for Suyeong from 2004 until in 2008, when he was defeated to the independent candidate Yoo Jae-jung, who later returned to the GNP. Though he lost again to Yoo in 2012, he served as the Secretary-General of the National Assembly from 2014 to 2016. He also served as the Senior Secretary to the President for Political Affairs from 2009 to 2010 under the President Lee Myung-bak.

Prior to his political career, Park worked as a journalist of JoongAng Ilbo and Monthly Mal. Since 2010s, he has been a commentator in various programmes i.e. Battle of Tongues, Powerful Opponents, Let's Be Politicians and so on.

Early life and education 
Park Heong-joon was born in Choryang-dong, East District, Busan, in 1960. His father was a doctor, whom he described as "an iron hand in a velvet glove". Little is known of his early family life, as he prefers to not talk about it.

Park was educated at Daeil High School and Korea University. While studying sociology at Korea University in 1980, he worked as an editor of the school magazine titled KU Culture (고대문화), as well as joining anti-government protests. During a protest on 13 May, he ran away from the venue after he found the riot police firing tear gas, which later hit the wall of Plaza Hotel. One of the shrapnels soon attacked his right eye and he was soon collapsed in the road. Not only his legs were burnt, his right eye was also injured till being unable to see properly regardless of wearing spectacles, in which he was later exempted from the national service. He then continued postgraduate studies and following the graduation, he was hired at JoongAng Ilbo in 1983 and worked for 2 years.

During the 1980s, Park was interested with left-wing ideologies i.e. Marxism. Not only studying those ideologies, he worked at left-leaning magazines, for example, Creation and Criticism and Reality and Science. In June 1991, he was briefly an editor of Monthly Mal, along with Jung Tae-in, who later joined the Justice Party and became a progressive economist.

Political career 
In the early 1990s, Park was a founding member of the Popular Party; others are Kim Moon-soo, Cha Myong-jin and Lee Jae-oh; all of them are now notable conservative figures. The party was, however, won no seats in the 1992 election and was deregistered.

In 1993, Park was hired by Park Se-il, who was later appointed the Senior Secretary to the President for Policy Planning to the then President Kim Young-sam, to write and help the government's projects and policies. He had completed The Plan and Strategy of Globalisation (세계화 구상과 전략) announced by the President Kim.

From 1995, he hosted important television debates in Busan. He was an emcee for the debate for the 1997 and the 2002 presidential elections. He also organised civic movements in Busan, such as establishing Forum New Thinking, Cultural City — Busan Creation Network and Movement for Decentralisation of Busan.

Park joined the main opposition Grand National Party (GNP) instead of the de facto ruling Uri Party. Despite of public criticism, he later revealed that the reason was to not just "rebuild" the GNP but also run under the GNP banner was more likely to win in right-leaning Busan. However, from what Sisa Journal reported was that he could not trust the leadership of the then President Roh Moo-hyun. He was nominated the GNP candidate for Suyeong in the 2004 election and competed against the ruling candidate Huh Jin-ho. Though he came behind to Huh at early polls, he was elected to the National Assembly.

On 26 August 2006, while he was a member of the Culture and Tourism Committee of the National Assembly, several sources reported that Park, along with Kim Jae-hong, an MP of the Uri Party, had visited an arcade game exhibition held in Los Angeles, United States from 13 to 15 September 2005, using the money from game industry associations. Amid criticisms, he said that it was an official visit suggested by the committee. On 5 September, the Uri Party sued both Park and Kim to the Ethics Committee. On 13 December, he was summoned by the prosecution for receiving 100 million won (≒ ￡63,000) from the CEO of Andamiro and a gift voucher association. However, he was cleared of wrongdoing on 23 February 2007.

During the 2007 presidential election, Park was one of the key figures helping the GNP presidential candidate Lee Myung-bak to be elected the country's President. Prior to the GNP presidential primary, he chose Lee instead of Park Geun-hye or Sohn Hak-kyu (quit the GNP before the primary) as he perceived that Lee is a "individualistic conservative" compared to Park who is a "nationalistic conservative". He also emphasised that South Korea needs a good Machiavellist, which could be acquired via Lee. Serving as the Spokesman to Lee, he accused the Blue House's decision to sue Lee. In the election on 19 December, Lee was officially elected the President of the Republic.

Despite of his contributions, Park failed to get re-elected in the 2008 election. During the election, he contested against a pro-Park Geun-hye independent candidate Yoo Jae-jung. At first, he was widely expected to get re-elected. However, amid anti-campaigns from the Parksamo (a fan club to Park Geun-hye), he only received 27,940 votes (41.96%), compared to Yoo who had received 36,577 votes (54.93%). In this election, another pro-Lee Myung-bak figures i.e. Lee Jae-oh, Lee Bang-ho and Kim Hee-jung, also lost.

Following the election, Park was appointed the Chief Spokesperson of the Blue House on 23 June. On 31 August 2009, he became the Senior Secretary to the President for Political Affairs.

In the 2012 election, Park was set to contest under the banner of the then ruling Saenuri (successor of the GNP) banner. This time, he faced a challenge from Yoo, who had already returned to the GNP (then Saenuri) following his election in 2008, at the preselection. The party, however, suddenly changed the preselection methods, which was strongly objected by Park. Park subsequently left the party and contested as an independent candidate. He received 24,630 votes (29.59%) and was again defeated by Yoo.

Post-political career 
On 1 September 2014, Park was appointed the new Secretary-General of the National Assembly. On 4 December 2015, he announced he would not contest for Suyeong in the 2016 election. His term as the Secretary-General of the National Assembly ended on 21 June 2016.

Following the election lost in 2012, he has been involving in various programmes, such as Battle of Tongues, Powerful Opponents, Let's Be Politicians and so on. In 2017, he became the commentator of the conservative panel of the Battle of Tongues, replacing the incumbent Jun Won-tchack who became a newsreader of TV Chosun.

On 18 July 2017, at Battle of Tongues, Park harshly accused the main opposition Liberty Korea Party (LKP) for not learning from its past mistakes i.e. 2016 political scandal. He also added that the party is only targeting far-right and elderly voters.

Return to politics 
On 9 January 2020, Park was appointed the Chairman of the Advance Committee for Innovation and Unity, an organisation seeking the unity of centrist and conservative parties including the then Liberty Korea Party (LKP) and the New Conservative Party (NCP). As a result, major conservative parties including both the LKP and the NCP was merged into the newly-formed United Future Party (UFP).

On 9 March, prior to the 2020 election, Park applied to nominate himself as a candidate for the Future Korea Party (FKP), the satellite party to the UFP. He, however, retracted the decision within 2 hours following the public backlash of his decision. He later apologised for the issue.

In the general election, the UFP-FKP alliance only secured 103 out of 300 seats, the worst result as a major conservative party since 1988. The party president, Hwang Kyo-ahn, who contested for Jongno, was also defeated by the former Prime Minister Lee Nak-yon. Park cited that the party lost about 30 seats due to hate speeches and defamatory remarks of its several candidates. The party renamed itself to the People Power Party (PPP).

On 29 October, Park officially rejoined the PPP, the same day when the former President Lee Myung-bak was sentenced to 17 years in jail.

2021 Busan mayoral election 

The resignation of the Mayor of Busan Oh Keo-don on 23 April 2020 following the allegations of sexual harassment has provoked the by-election in 2021.

Prior to the election, Park was considered one of the potential candidate of the UFP (then PPP), along with an ex-MP Lee Un-ju, the former Mayor Suh Byung-soo, the former Dongnae Mayor Lee Jin-bok and so on. On 31 August, The Kookje Daily News had reported that Park was considering to run for the election.

On 15 December, Park officially launched his bid for Busan mayorship at Busan Port International Exhibition & Convention Centre. Following are the manifestos included in his declaration:
 Building the new airport (replacing the incumbent Gimhae International Airport) in Gadeok Island
 Developing the Port of Busan
 Artificial intelligence education for primary and secondary students

On 4 March 2021, Park won PPP preselection with obtaining 54.40%, defeating the former Deputy Mayor of Busan Park Seong-hun and the former MP for Gwangmyeong 2nd constituency Lee Un-ju.

From November 2020 to March 2020, various polls indicated that he had been the most favourable candidate.

On 12 March 2021, Park posted on his Facebook that he has quit as a professor of Dong-a University that he had been working from 1 September 1991. He indicated that he would permanently quit as a scholar but become as a full-time politician. Nevertheless, on 25 March, The Hankyoreh reported that his withdrawal from Dong-a University was shortly after he opened courses for a new semester. According to the newspaper, Park had opened 2 courses (1 for postgraduate and 1 other for doctorate) in February and the course selection period was from 15 to 25 February, while he was contesting PPP preselection for Busan mayorship. As the first class was on 4 March, the same day he was officially nominated as the candidate, the lecturer-in-charge for the doctorate course was immediately replaced to another person while the postgraduate course was abolished. This movement provoked a public uproar; one professor whom he used to work together with Park condemned that "the students' rights to learn were trampled". On the other hand, Park's election campaign revealed that Park has already resigned on 28 February, but there were some issues with the resignation letter, and could only be submitted on 2 March (accepted a week later). They also indicated that the postgraduate course was abolished due to the lack of students.

The exit poll released shortly after the election on 7 April showed that Park was expected to obtain 64.0%, while the Democratic candidate Kim Young-choon could only receive 33.0%. He expressed his gratitude to his supporters after he was confirmed to be elected. At 02:30 KST 8 April, the ballot counting was finished, and Park received 961,576 votes (62.67%).

Mayor of Busan 
Park was set to take an oath at 11:00 KST 8 April 2021 after he receives a certificate of election from the Busan Metropolitan City Election Commission. His term will end on 30 June 2022 as he was elected in a by-election; he will only serve the remaining term of Oh Keo-don.

Inauguration 
Park paid a visit to Chungnyeolsa at 8:30 KST 8 April, and then subsequently headed to the City Election Commission, where he received a certificate of election. His inauguration ceremony at the Busan Metropolitan City Hall was proceeded with an online format due to the social distancing measurement Tier 2 in order to curb the COVID-19 pandemic.

Political orientation 
Formerly a left-wing Marxist, Park's political stance has been moved to centre-right. In 2007, he also declared himself as a "centre-right". During the administration of Lee Myung-bak, he set the government's stance as centrist pragmatism.

Nowadays, Park is critical towards left-wing ideology. He criticised South Korean leftists as "being too nationalistic in front of reunification issues". He also calls the Moon Jae-in government's policy to increase the minimum wage to 10,000 won (≒ ￡6.7) as a "populist policy".

Personal life 
Park married Cho Hyun, a businesswoman who has been operating Cho Hyun Gallery (World Gallery before 2008) since 1990. Her mother died in 2009. Both has a son and a daughter. On 17 March 2021, he revealed through his Facebook that Cho Hyun is his second wife. JoongAng Ilbo reported 2 days later that Cho has already been having a daughter and a son with her ex-husband, and then remarried Park in December 1999.

Works

Television

Books 
 Modern Society and Ethics (1990)
 Modern Labour Process Theory (1991)
 Modern Society and Ideology (1992)
 Frontier of the 21st Century (1994)
 Digitisation — The Meaning in the History of Civilisation and the Way of National Strategy (1996)
 Understanding the 21st Century (1997)
 Reflective Civil Society and Citizens' Movement (2001)
 A Study on the Application of Regulatory Negotiations (2007)
 Korean Society — What and How to Change (2014)
 Reconstitution of Conservatism (2019)

Election results

General elections

Local elections

Mayor of Busan

References

External links 
 Park Heong-joon on YouTube
 Park Heong-joon on Twitter

1960 births
Living people
Mayors of Busan
People from Busan
South Korean journalists
Members of the National Assembly (South Korea)
People Power Party (South Korea) politicians
Korea University alumni
21st-century South Korean politicians
Academic staff of Dong-a University